Lawyers in Singapore are part of a fused profession, meaning that they may act as both a solicitor and as an advocate, although lawyers usually specialize in one of litigation, conveyancing or corporate law.

The number of lawyers in Singapore has declined in the first decade of the 21st century. There were 3,300 lawyers in 2006. Parliament approved changes in 2009 to replace the 'pupillage' system with structured training, and to make it easier for lawyers to return to practise.

International law firms are generally limited to corporate, finance and banking law.

In 2007, there were 4200 lawyers practising law in Singapore, up from 4000 in 2002.

In July 2009, there were 95 foreign firms with offices in Singapore, and 840 foreign lawyers, up from 576 in 2000. Six international firms were given license to practice local corporate law for the first time in December 2008.

In 2012, there were 5200 lawyers practising in Singapore, according to statistics from the Ministry of Law.

The Big Four law firms in Singapore consists of Allen & Gledhill, Drew & Napier, Rajah & Tann, and WongPartnership.

Ranking by Scale 
The following table ranks, by size, domestic and international law firms with at least one office situated in Singapore in 2021.

See also
List of Hong Kong law firms by size
Admission in practice law in Singapore
Judicial system of Singapore
Law of Singapore
Law Society of Singapore
Singapore Academy of Law
Singapore Legal Service

References

External links
The Law Society of Singapore